Arturo Vera (born 19 March 1946) is an Argentine Radical Civic Union politician. He was a member of the Argentine Senate representing Entre Ríos Province from 2007 to 2013.

Vera served as a provincial deputy from 1999 to 2003. He was elected to the Senate in 2007, narrowly beating the Socialist Party's Jorge Daneri in the run-off for the third place. He had contested the primary to be the Radical candidate for governor. earlier in the year.

External links
Senate profile

References

Living people
People from Entre Ríos Province
Members of the Argentine Senate for Entre Ríos
Radical Civic Union politicians
1946 births